Clark County is a county located in the southeastern part of U.S. state of Illinois, along the Indiana state line. As of the 2010 census, the population was 16,335. Its county seat is Marshall. The county was named for George Rogers Clark, an officer who served in the American Revolution.

History
Clark County was formed in 1819 out of Crawford County. At the time of its formation, Clark County included about a third of Illinois, and extended as far north as the present state of Wisconsin. In 1821 the northern part of Clark County became part of the newly created Pike County on January 31, and the newly created Fayette County took the western part of Clark County on February 14. Edgar County was created from the northern part of Clark County on January 3, 1823. The creation of Coles County occupied additional land from western Clark County, effective December 25, 1830. The boundaries of Clark County have been unchanged since.

Clark County was named for George Rogers Clark (older brother of William Clark of the Lewis and Clark Expedition), an officer of the army of Virginia that captured the Northwest Territory from the British during the Revolutionary War.

The county seat was located in Darwin Township in 1823. A county-wide referendum was held In 1839 to determine whether Auburn or Marshall would be designated as the new seat. Marshall won the election and has remained the county seat since then.

Geography
Part of the county's eastern border is defined by the Wabash River. The North Fork of the Embarras River and Hurricane Creek are the main streams in western Clark County. Other than the Wabash River, Big Creek is the major stream in the eastern part of the county.

Adjacent counties
 Edgar County - north
 Vigo County, Indiana - northeast
 Sullivan County, Indiana - southeast
 Crawford County - south
 Jasper County - southwest
 Cumberland County - west
 Coles County - northwest

Major highways
  Interstate 70
  U.S. Route 40
  Illinois Route 1
  Illinois Route 49

Climate and weather 

Demographics

As of the 2010 United States Census, there were 16,335 people, 6,782 households, and 4,593 families residing in the county. The racial makeup of the county was 98.1% white, 0.3% black or African American, 0.3% Asian, 0.2% American Indian, 0.3% from other races, and 0.7% from two or more races. Those of Hispanic or Latino origin made up 1.1% of the population. In terms of ancestry, 27.4% were German, 14.2% were Irish, 14.2% were English, and 10.8% were American.

Of the 6,782 households, 30.3% had children under the age of 18 living with them, 53.5% were married couples living together, 9.7% had a female householder with no husband present, 32.3% were non-families, and 27.7% of all households were made up of individuals. The average household size was 2.38 and the average family size was 2.87. The median age was 42.3 years.

The median income for a household in the county was $43,597 and the median income for a family was $52,689. Males had a median income of $39,385 versus $27,426 for females. The per capita income for the county was $23,173. About 7.6% of families and 10.9% of the population were below the poverty line, including 15.3% of those under age 18 and 9.8% of those age 65 or over.

Education 
There are three school districts in Clark County (Marshall, Martinsville and Casey-Westfield) with a total enrollment (2004) of 3,014 students.  Each district has one high school (grades 9–12) and one junior high school (grades 7–8).  Marshall has two elementary schools and the other districts have one each.

See List of school districts in
Clark County

Communities

Cities
 Casey
 Marshall (seat)
 Martinsville

Village
 Westfield

Census designated places
 West Union

Unincorporated communities

 Adenmoor
 Allright
 Castle Fin
 Choctaw
 Clark Center
 Clarksville
 Cleone
 Darwin
 Dennison
 Doyles
 Ernst
 Farrington
 Hogue Town
 Livingston
 McKeen
 Melrose
 Moonshine
 Moriah
 Neadmore
 Oak Point
 Oakcrest
 Oilfield
 Orange
 Patton
 Snyder
 Walnut Prairie
 Weaver
 Weir
 York

Townships
Clark County is divided into fifteen townships:

 Anderson
 Auburn
 Casey
 Darwin
 Dolson
 Douglas
 Johnson
 Marshall
 Martinsville
 Melrose
 Orange
 Parker
 Wabash
 Westfield
 York

Former Settlement
 Griffin

Politics
In its early days, Clark County favored the Democratic Party, not supporting a Republican presidential candidate until Theodore Roosevelt’s 1904 landslide. Since 1920, it has been a strongly Republican county: the last Democrat to win a majority being Lyndon Johnson in 1964, and only Bill Clinton by plurality in 1992 has won the county since.

See also
 National Register of Historic Places listings in Clark County, Illinois

Sources
 Perrin, William Henry, ed.. History of Crawford and Clark Counties, Illinois Chicago, Illinois. O. L. Baskin & Co. (1883).

References
Specific

General
 United States Census Bureau 2007 TIGER/Line Shapefiles
 United States Board on Geographic Names (GNIS)
 United States National Atlas

External links 
 Clark County, Illinois History and Genealogy
 

 
Illinois counties
1819 establishments in Illinois
Populated places established in 1819